Binary combinatory logic (BCL) is a computer programming language that uses binary terms 0 and 1 to create a complete formulation of combinatory logic using only the symbols 0 and 1. Using the S and K combinators, complex boolean algebra functions can be made. BCL has applications in the theory of program-size complexity (Kolmogorov complexity).

Definition

S-K Basis 
Utilizing K and S combinators of the Combinatory logic, logical functions can be represented in as functions of combinators:

Syntax
Backus–Naur form:
 <term> ::= 00 | 01 | 1 <term> <term>

Semantics
The denotational semantics of BCL may be specified as follows:
 [ 00 ] == K 
 [ 01 ] == S
 [ 1 <term1> <term2> ] == ( [<term1>] [<term2>] )   
where "[...]" abbreviates "the meaning of ...". (The prefix 1 corresponds to a left parenthesis, right parentheses being unnecessary for disambiguation.)

Thus there are four equivalent formulations of BCL, depending on the manner of encoding the triplet (K, S, left parenthesis).  These are (00, 01, 1) (as in the present version), (01, 00, 1), (10, 11, 0), and (11, 10, 0).

The operational semantics of BCL, apart from eta-reduction (which is not required for Turing completeness), may be very compactly specified by the following rewriting rules for subterms of a given term, parsing from the left:
   1100xy  → x   
  11101xyz → 11xz1yz   
where x, y, and z are arbitrary subterms. (Note, for example, that because parsing is from the left, 10000 is not a subterm of 11010000.)

BCL can be used to replicate algorithms like Turing machines and Cellular automata, BCL is Turing complete.

See also
 Iota and Jot

References

Further reading

External links
 John's Lambda Calculus and Combinatory Logic Playground
 A minimal implementation in C
 
Algorithmic information theory
Combinatory logic